Rivales is a 2008 Spanish comedy-sport film directed by Fernando Colomo and written by Joaquín Oristrell and Inés París. The plot follows an Under-12 Spanish football tournament.

Plot 

When two youth football teams from Madrid and Barcelona with a longstanding rivalry reach the finals of the Youth Spanish Cup, the tension explodes on and off the field. The players from both teams share a bus and hotel with each other and with their coaches (who are in love but hide it), parents, a crazy grandmother, reporters and even pets. Guillermo (played by Ernesto Altiero) and his son Xavier find their relationship tested as Guillermo remembers his own failure to make the championship in his youth, while Xavier chooses his girlfriend over football. In director Fernando Colomo's own words, this is a "road trip movie about human relationships."

Cast

References

External links 

 

2008 films
Spanish sports comedy films
Spanish LGBT-related films
Spanish association football films
2000s sports comedy films
2008 comedy films
2000s Spanish films
2000s Spanish-language films
Films directed by Fernando Colomo